"Could've Been" is a song by American singer H.E.R. featuring Bryson Tiller. It impacted urban adult contemporary radio on September 25, 2018 as the first and only single from her EP I Used to Know Her: The Prelude. It was later included on the singer's second compilation album I Used to Know Her published in 2019.

Music video
The music video for "Could've Been", directed by Lacey Duke, was published in November 2018.

Accolades
"Could've Been" was nominated for the BET Award for Best Collaboration at the BET Awards 2019 but lost to "Sicko Mode" by Travis Scott featuring Drake. It was also nominated for the MTV Video Music Award for Best R&B Video at the 2019 MTV Video Music Awards but lost to "Waves" by Normani featuring 6lack.

"Could've Been" received additional nominations at the 62nd Grammy Awards including Best R&B Song and Best R&B Performance.

Controversy 
Wilson and her co-writers paid an undisclosed amount in a March 2023 settlement concerning their unauthorized sampling of the award-winning Take 6 song "Come Unto Me" in the making of "Could've Been".

Charts

Certifications

References

2018 songs
H.E.R. songs
Bryson Tiller songs
Songs written by H.E.R.